In organic chemistry, an azo coupling is an organic reaction between a diazonium compound and another aromatic compound that produces an azo compound.   In this electrophilic aromatic substitution reaction, the aryldiazonium cation is the electrophile and the activated arene is a nucleophile.  In most cases, including the examples below,  the diazonium compound is also aromatic.

Diazotization 
The process of conversion of primary aromatic amines into its diazonium salt is called diazotization. Diazonium salts are important synthetic intermediates that can undergo coupling reactions to form azo dyes and electrophilic substitution reactions to introduce functional groups.

Uses of the reaction
Aromatic azo compounds tend to be brightly colored due to the extended conjugated systems.  Many are used as dyes (see azo dye).  Important azo dyes include methyl red and pigment red 170.  Azo printing exploits this reaction as well.

Azo coupling is also used to produce prontosil and other sulfa drugs.

Examples of azo C-coupling reactions
Many procedures have been described.  Phenol reacts with benzenediazonium chloride to give a Solvent Yellow 7, a yellow-orange azo compound.  The reaction is base-catalysed.

The related dye called aniline yellow is produced from the reaction of aniline and the diazonium salt. Naphthols are popular acceptors.  One example is the synthesis of the dye "organol brown" from aniline and 1-naphthol:

Similarly β-naphthol couples with phenyldiazonium electrophile to produce an intense orange-red dye.

Examples of azo N-coupling reactions

In alkaline media, diazonium salt can react with most primary and secondary amines that exist as a free base and produce triazene. This chemical reaction is called azo N-coupling or the synthesis of azoamines.

References

Substitution reactions
Carbon-heteroatom bond forming reactions